Gauntlet or the gauntlet may refer to:

Common uses
Gauntlet (glove), protective gloves used as a form of armor
Running the gauntlet, a form of physical punishment

Arts, entertainment, and media

Fictional characters
Gauntlet (comics), a Marvel Comics superhero
Gauntlet (Inhuman), a Marvel Comics supervillain

Games
Gauntlet (1985 video game), a 1985 four-player arcade game with many followups:
Gauntlet II, a 1986 arcade sequel
Gauntlet: The Third Encounter, a 1990 game for the Atari Lynx
Gauntlet III: The Final Quest, a 1991 home computer game
Gauntlet IV, a 1994 video game for the Sega Genesis
Gauntlet Legends, a 1998 arcade game
Gauntlet Dark Legacy, a 2000 arcade game
Gauntlet: Seven Sorrows, a 2005 video game
Gauntlet (2014 video game), developed by Arrowhead Game studios
Gauntlet (Nintendo DS), an unreleased remake of the first game
Gauntlet (Donald R. Lebeau video game), a 1984 shoot 'em up game for the Atari 8-bit family
Gauntlet (Micro Power video game), a 1984 Defender clone
The Gauntlet (module), an adventure module for Dungeons & Dragons

Television

Series
Real World/Road Rules Challenge: The Gauntlet (2003–2004), an MTV reality television game show series
Real World/Road Rules Challenge: The Gauntlet II (2005–2006), an MTV reality television game show series
Real World/Road Rules Challenge: The Gauntlet III (2008), an MTV reality television game show series

Episodes
"Gauntlet" (Stargate Universe), an episode of Stargate Universe
"The Gauntlet" (Supergirl), an episode of Supergirl
"The Gauntlet," an episode of MacGyver
"The Gauntlet," the name given to the twelfth season of Mystery Science Theater 3000

Other uses in arts, entertainment, and media
Gauntlet (newspaper), published by students at the University of Calgary
"The Gauntlet" (comics), a Spider-Man storyline
The Gauntlet (film), 1977, starring Clint Eastwood and Sondra Locke
The Gauntlet (novel), a children's book, written by Ronald Welch, 1951
RVR-01 "Gauntlet", a fighter craft in the game Thunder Force V

Sports
Gauntlet for the Gold, a professional wrestling match type exclusive to TNA Wrestling
Gauntlet match, a professional wrestling match type

Other uses
Gauntlet (body piercing studio), a former California-based company, closed in 1998
Gauntlet track, a type of railroad track
Gloster Gauntlet, a British biplane
SA-15 "Gauntlet", a Soviet surface-to-air missile

See also